Marcel Granier Haydon (born July 4, 1941) is a Venezuelan businessperson.  He is the President and CEO of Empresas 1BC and the General Director of Radio Caracas Televisión (RCTV), which until becoming a cable TV-channel on May 27, 2007, was the most watched television channel in Venezuela.

Biography
Marcel Granier was born on July 4, 1941 to Marcel Granier Doyeux and Brígida Haydon Urbaneja.  He attended law school and later married Dorothy Phelps Tovar, the granddaughter of the founder of Empresas 1BC and Radio Caracas Radio, William Henry Phelps. They have six children together; Marcel Alfredo Granier Phelps, Carlos Eduardo Granier Phelps, María Cristina Granier Phelps, María Clara Granier Phelps, Isabel Helena Granier Phelps, and Jorge Ignacio Granier Phelps.  In 1969, Granier quit practising law and became a director at RCTV, moving up the ranks to his current position.  On November 10, 1976, he began hosting Primer Plano, a controversial talk show that has aired off and on throughout the years, with the most recent show airing on November 30, 2006.

Publications 
 La generación de relevo vs. el estado omnipotente (1984) 
 Más y mejor democracia (1987)

2002 coup attempt
Marcel Granier and his television network have been accused of supporting the April 11, 2002 coup attempt against President Hugo Chávez, the brief government of Pedro Carmona Estanga, and the general strike that began on December 2, 2002 and lasted until February 4, 2003. These events resulted in the government's refusal to renew RCTV's license to air on the public airwaves. Granier claims that this license did not need renewing and that this was an "illegal shutdown" by the government. Upon the shutdown, Chavez claimed RCTV would be punished for criticizing the government, specifically for being "bourgeois" and for "coup plotting." Granier and the other directors at the network fight for its return to the public airwaves. Human rights groups have decried the shutdown, with Thor Halvorssen of the Human Rights Foundation calling the shut down "the final move in his (Chavez') drive to shut down all independent voices."

See also
Eladio Lárez
Empresas 1BC
Radio Caracas Radio (RCR)
Radio Caracas Televisión (RCTV)
Recordland
William Henry Phelps
William H. Phelps, Jr.

References

External links
Marcel Granier Freedom Collection interview

Living people
RCTV personalities
Venezuelan chief executives
20th-century Venezuelan lawyers
1941 births
Presidents of boards of companies of Venezuela